Ishq (‘išq) is an Arabic word meaning "love" or "passion", also widely used in other languages of the Muslim world and the Indian subcontinent.

The word ishq does not appear in the Quran, which instead uses derivatives of the verbal root , such as the noun . The word is traditionally derived from the verbal root  "to stick, to cleave to" and connected to the noun , which denotes a kind of ivy. In its most common classical interpretation, ishq refers to the irresistible desire to obtain possession of the beloved (ma‘shuq), expressing a deficiency that the lover (‘āshiq) must remedy in order to reach perfection (kamāl). Like the perfections of the soul and the body, love thus admits of hierarchical degrees, but its underlying reality is the aspiration to the beauty (al-husn) which God manifested in the world when he created Adam in his own image. The Islamic conception of love acquired further dimensions from the Greek-influenced view that the notions of Beauty, Good, and Truth (al-haqq) "go back to one indissoluble Unity (wahda)".

Among classical Muslim authors, the notion of love was developed along three conceptual lines, oftentimes conceived in an ascending hierarchical order: natural love, intellectual love and divine love. The growth of affection (mawadda) into passionate love (ishq) received its most probing and realistic analysis in The Ring of the Dove by the Andalusian scholar Ibn Hazm.

The term ishq is used extensively in Sufi poetry and literature to describe a "selfless and burning love" for Allah. It is the core concept in the doctrine of Islamic mysticism as is key to the connection between man and God. Ishq itself is sometimes held to have been the basis of "creation". The term ishq is widely used in the sacred text of Sikhism.

Etymology

Traditional Persian lexicographers considered the Persian  and Arabic  to derive from the Arabic verbal root  "to stick, to cleave to".

Heydari-Malayeri suggests that may have an Indo-European origin and may be related to Avestan words such as  "to wish, desire, search", and ultimately derive from *iška. The Avestan  also exists in Middle Persian in the form of  "desire".

As a word in different languages

Some scholars objected to the use of the term 'ishq' due to its association with sensual love but despite the linguistic, cultural or technical meanings, Sufis believe that 'ishq' can only be associated to the Divine.

The word ishq referred to traditional ghazals and Indo-Persian literary culture and has made its way to many other languages which were influenced by Sufism.

In Persian, Ishq construed with the verbs "bākhtan باختن", "khāstan خواستن", "sanjīdan سنجیدن", "rūīdan روییدن", "nešāndan نشاندن", etc. In Persian, "Āšeq عاشق" is the active participle (lover), "Ma'shūq معشوق" is the passive participle (beloved), and "Ma'shūqe معشوقه" conveys a vulgar meaning, whilst in Arabic it is the female passive participle of "Mā'shūq معشوق".

In Urdu, Ishq (عشق) is used to refer to fervent love for any object, person or God. However, it is mostly used in its religious context. In Urdu, three very common religious terminologies have been derived from Ishq. These terminologies are Ishq-e-Haqīqi (love of Truth), Ishq-e majāzi (love of God's creation i.e. a human), and ishq-e rasūl / ishq-e Muhammadi (love of the Messenger / love of Muhammad). Other than these, in non-religious context, ‘ishq is a synonym for obsessive love.

In Turkish, Aşk is commonly used to express love, passion or adoration. The Turkish version replaces the 'q' with a 'k', as Turkish lacks voiceless uvular plosive, and the letter 'ş' with the cedilla denotes the "sh" sound, . In comparison with Arabic or Urdu, (like Persian) the word is less restrictive and can be applied to many forms of love, or simply romance. It is common in the lyrics of Turkish songs.

Ishq is used in the Hindi-language, especially in Bollywood movies (Hindi cinema), which often use formal, flowery and poetic Hindi loanwords derived from Persian. The more colloquial Hindi word for love is pyar. In Hindi,  (इश्क़) means lustless love. In Arabic, it is a noun. However, in Hindi-Urdu it is used as both verb and noun.

In Sufism

In religious context, Ishq, divided into three kinds, is a very important but rather complex concept of Sufi tradition of Islam.

Ishq-e Majāzi
Ishq-e Majāzi literally means "metaphorical love". It refers to the love for God's creation i.e. love of a man for a woman or another man and vice versa. It is said to be generated by beloved person's external beauty but since it is connected to lust, it is against the law and considered unlawful. Hence, in Faqr, the term Ishq-e-Majazi is directed only towards Ishq-e-Murshid. This love for one's Murshid eventually leads to love for Muhammad and eventually for God, upon which one that understands Ishq-e-Haqeeqi is in fact the source of all 'metaphorical love'.

Ishq-e Rasūl or Ishq-e Muhammadi
Ishq-e Rasūl means "love of Muhammad," an important part of being a Muslim. In Sufism, however, the Ishq-e-Majazi changes its form to Ishq-e-Rasool through the development of an intense feeling of Ishq for Muhammad. Every existent form of creation is in fact the slave of the Creator (in the sense of being subject to His will). Since Muhammad is the most beloved to Allah, the true Lover feels Ishq-e-Rasool till "the Prophet becomes dearer to him than his life, wives, children, house, business and everything else". (Sahih Bukhari and Muslim)
Many Sufis firmly believe that the souls of the entire creation were created from the soul of Muhammad. Hence, the purified soul of the Lover craves to return to him (similarly to the Platonic view of the fractured human soul and its desire to become whole). This is experienced at the level where the Lover witnesses the reflection of all the attributes of God within Muhammad.

Ishq-e Haqeeqi
Ishq-e Haqīqi literally means "the real love" i.e. "the love of God". It refers to the belief that only God is worth loving and He is the only one who can return His creature's love for Him.
The inner subtlety whose locus is the heart is felt by the true seeker of God only. According to this view, this is what differences man from beast because even beasts have senses, whereas inner sight is characteristic of humans.

"And those who truly believe, love Allah intensely." (Al-Baqarah 165)

In Sikhism 
The term ‘Ishq’ (Punjabi:  ਇਸ਼ਕ ) has been used multiple times in the Guru Granth Sahib as well as other religious texts of the Sikhs such as those written by Bhai Gurdas and Bhai Nandlal. The concept of ‘Ishq’ in Sikhism is similar to that of Ishq-e-haqiqi in Sufism.  The Guru Granth Sahib on page 37 says “ He Himself dyes us in the Color of His Love; through the Word of His Shabad, He unites us with Himself.” ( Siree Raag, Third Mehl)

See also
 Sufism
 Agape
 Ashik
 Chesed
 Divine Love
 Metta

References

Sufism
Love
Arabic words and phrases